Universal Building Society was a UK building society with headquarters in Newcastle upon Tyne that operated between 1863 and 2006 .  It was merged with the Newcastle Building Society in 2006.

History and merger
The building society was established in Newcastle upon Tyne in 1863.

In 2006, it merged with the Newcastle Building Society. At the time of the merger, the Universal was the 29th largest building society in the UK with assets of £600m. It had nine branches and employed approximately 130 staff.

References

External links

Newcastle Building Society website

Banks established in 1863
1863 establishments in the United Kingdom